The 1972–73 Roller Hockey Champions Cup was the 8th edition of the Roller Hockey Champions Cup organized by CERH.

Barcelona achieved their first title ever.

Teams
The champions of the main European leagues, and Reus Deportiu as title holders, played this competition, consisting in a double-legged knockout tournament. As Reus Deportiu was also the Spanish league champions, Barcelona also joined the tournament.

Bracket

Source:

References

External links
 CERH website

1972 in roller hockey
1973 in roller hockey
Rink Hockey Euroleague